The 2005 West Asian Women's Football Championship took place in Amman, Jordan.  It was the first West Asian Football Federation Women's championship.  Five teams participated and the hosts won.

Results

References

2005
WAFF
2005–06 in Jordanian football
2005